Antonio Gibson (born June 23, 1998) is an American football running back for the Washington Commanders of the National Football League (NFL). A native of Georgia, he played college football at East Central Community College in Mississippi for two years prior to transferring to Memphis in 2018.

As a return specialist and wide receiver with Memphis, Gibson was named American Athletic Conference (AAC) special teams player of the year in 2019 and received conference honors for both positions. He entered the 2020 NFL Draft as a running back, where he was selected by Washington in the third round.

Early life and college
Gibson attended Eagle's Landing High School in McDonough, Georgia, playing for their football, basketball and track teams. As a senior, he was named the Henry Daily Herald offensive player of the year. Gibson enrolled at East Central Community College in 2016, playing football for them prior to transferring to the University of Memphis in 2018. In his two years at East Central, he had 50 receptions for 871 receiving yards with 13 touchdowns, 27 kick returns, 554 kick-return yards and 249 rushing yards. He played wide receiver and running back at Memphis.

In his two years, he had 44 receptions for 834 yards with 10 touchdowns, 369 rushing yards and four touchdowns and 647 return yards and a touchdown. In 2019, he was named the AAC Special Teams Player of the Year and made first-team all-AAC as a return specialist and second-team as a wide receiver, becoming only the fourth player in conference history to receive such an honor at two positions. He was invited to the 2020 Senior Bowl as a running back, where he recorded 68 rushing yards on 11 carries.

Professional career

2020

Gibson entered the 2020 NFL Draft as a running back prospect, where he was selected by the Washington Redskins in the third round (66th overall). Team executives cited his ability to play various positions as a major reason why they drafted him. He signed his four-year rookie contract on July 22, 2020.

He scored his first career touchdown, an 11-yard run, in Week 2 against the Arizona Cardinals. In Week 4 against the Baltimore Ravens, Gibson recorded 128 total yards from scrimmage along with a rushing touchdown. He recorded his first career 100-yard rushing game in Week 7 against the Dallas Cowboys, rushing 20 times for 128 yards and a touchdown.

In a rematch against the Cowboys on Thanksgiving, Gibson rushed for 115 yards and three touchdowns during a 41–16 victory. He was the first rookie to score three touchdowns on Thanksgiving since Randy Moss in 1998, and the first running back on the same day to rush for over 100 yards with three touchdowns since Barry Sanders in 1997. He was also named the Pepsi NFL Rookie of the Week for his performance. The following week against the Pittsburgh Steelers, he suffered a turf toe injury early in the first quarter and subsequently missed the rest of that game and the next one against the San Francisco 49ers. Gibson finished the 2020 season leading all rookies in rushing touchdowns with 11, and was also the first Washington rookie to record 1,000 yards from scrimmage since Alfred Morris in 2012.

2021
In Week 3 of the 2021 season, Gibson recorded a 73–yard touchdown reception against the Buffalo Bills. The play was the second-longest touchdown reception by a Washington running back in franchise history. The next week, he recorded 63 yards and one touchdown in the win over the Atlanta Falcons, which brought him over 1,000 career rushing yards. This made Gibson the third Washington player in the franchise's history to attain 1,000 rushing yards within his first two seasons since running back Alfred Morris and quarterback Robert Griffin III. On Monday Night Football against the Seattle Seahawks, he recorded 111 yards over 29 carries in the Week 12 win which was his first 100-plus rushing yard game of the season. On December 31, 2021, he was placed on the team's COVID-19 reserve list and was forced to sit out of the Week 17 game against the Philadelphia Eagles. He was placed back on active roster on January 5, 2022.

2022

In the 2022 preseason, Gibson was announced as the team's new kick returner while losing his starting position to rookie running back Brian Robinson Jr. Following Robinson Jr. being shot, Gibson returned as the team's starting running back in the beginning of the 2022 season. In the Week 7 win over the Green Bay Packers, Gibson recorded 59 rushing yards, three receptions, 18 receiving yards, and one receiving touchdown. The touchdown was the franchise's 3,000 in their history, with the ball being displayed in the Pro Football Hall of Fame. On January 5, 2023, he was placed on injured reserve. He finished the season with 546 rushing yards and three touchdowns, along with 46 catches for 353 yards and two touchdowns.

Statistics

References

External links

 
 Washington Commanders bio
 Memphis Tigers bio

1998 births
Living people
People from Stockbridge, Georgia
Players of American football from Georgia (U.S. state)
Sportspeople from the Atlanta metropolitan area
American football running backs
American football wide receivers
American football return specialists
East Central Warriors football players
Memphis Tigers football players
Washington Commanders players
Washington Football Team players
African-American players of American football
21st-century African-American sportspeople